Scandal were a short lived Australian pop rock band formed in 1976. The group released one studio album which peaked at number 50 on the Australian charts in 1978.

Discography

Albums

Singles

References

Australian pop music groups
Musical groups established in 1976
Musical groups disestablished in 1979